Cherie Louise Gardiner (born 1991) is the 2009 Miss Northern Ireland, from Bangor, County Down, Northern Ireland. She represented the nation at the Miss World 2009.

Beauty pageant career
Gardiner came into prominence after winning the title of 2009 Miss Northern Ireland, in a ceremony held in the Europa Hotel in Belfast. Gardiner represented Northern Ireland at the Miss World 2009 pageant in South Africa in November 2009.

References

External links
Miss Northern Ireland Cherie Gardiner launches Rose Week

1991 births
Living people
People from Bangor, County Down
Miss World 2009 delegates
Miss Northern Ireland winners